The White Bear First Nations ( wâpi-maskwa) are a First Nation band government in southeastern Saskatchewan, Canada.

Etymology

The Nation bears the name of its Chief Wahpiimusqua (1815-1900, wâpimaskwa, "white bear"), who signed an adhesion to Treaty 4 in 1875. Despite this, he ultimately settled next to Moose Mountain Provincial Park with his band, which is in the Treaty 2 area.

Reserves
 White Bear 70
 Treaty Four Reserve Grounds 77 (shared between 33 First Nations)

References

First Nations in Saskatchewan